This is a bibliography of tuberculosis (TB), an infectious disease that generally affects the lungs. As of 2018, the World Health Organization estimated that 25% of the world's population was infected with the latent form of the disease. In its active form, it is one of the top 10 causes of death worldwide.

This bibliography is of non-fiction works about TB in human beings. It covers general works, key scientific papers, treatment methods and drug resistance.


General works
 Bynum, Helen. (2012) Spitting Blood. Oxford University Press. .
 Calwell, H. G. & D. H. Craig. (1984) The White Plague in Ulster: A short history of tuberculosis in Northern Ireland. [Belfast]: Ulster Medical Society.
 Chrétien, Jacques. (1998) Tuberculosis - the Illustrated History of a Disease. Translated by Clare Pierard. Union Internationale Contre la Tuberculose et les.
 Dormandy, Thomas. (1999) The White Death: A History of Tuberculosis. Hambledon Press. 
 Ellison, David L. (1994) Healing Tuberculosis in the Woods: Medicine and science at the end of the nineteenth century. Praeger. 
 Elwin, Malcolm. (1953) The Life of Llewelyn Powys. London: Macdonald.
 Ryan, Frank. (1992) Tuberculosis: The Greatest Story Never Told. Bromsgrove: Swift. 
 Vidya Krishnan, (2022), Phantom Plague: How Tuberculosis Shaped our History, PublicAffairs, ISBN 9781541768468

Drug resistance
 Reichman, Lee B. & Janice Tanne. (2000) Timebomb: The Global Epidemic of Multi-drug Resistant Tuberculosis. McGraw-Hill.

References

Bibliographies of medicine
Microbiology literature
Tuberculosis